Severe Cyclonic Storm Laila was the first cyclonic storm to affect southeastern India in May since the 1990 Andhra Pradesh cyclone. The first tropical cyclone of the annual season, Laila developed on May 17 in the Bay of Bengal from a persistent area of convection. Strengthening as it tracked northwestward, it became a severe cyclonic storm on May 19. The next day, Laila made landfall in Andhra Pradesh, and it later dissipated over land. It caused flooding and damage along its path. Laila is an Urdu/Arabic name, meaning Night. It was the worst storm to hit Andhra Pradesh in the last 14 years.

Meteorological history

In the middle of May 2010, an area of convection, or thunderstorms, persisted about 865 miles (1400 km) south of the Indian city of Kolkata (formerly Calcutta) in the Bay of Bengal. It was initially disorganized, although satellite imagery indicated a mid-level circulation. After a few days, the convection began consolidating around a developing low-level circulation, and rainbands became evident. With low amounts of wind shear in the region, the Joint Typhoon Warning Center (JTWC) assessed its chances of development as fair. The official warning agency in the basin – the India Meteorological Department (IMD) – classified the system as Depression BOB 001 at 0900 UTC on May 17. About three hours after the depression was first classified, the IMD upgraded the system to a deep depression, indicating sustained winds of at least .

Late on May 17, the JTWC classified the system as Tropical Cyclone 01B, based on further organization. By that time, it was located about 485 miles (780 km) east-southeast of Chennai, Tamil Nadu, and was moving westward due to its position southwest of the subtropical ridge. The IMD upgraded the deep depression to Cyclonic Storm Laila early on May 18. With further consolidation of the convection throughout the day, the JTWC noted that the storm "[appeared] to be rapidly intensifying", which is a term referring to a quick drop in barometric pressure that usually coincides with a sharp increase in winds. A few hours later, the IMD upgraded Laila to a severe cyclonic storm.

After reaching peak intensity, Laila briefly decelerated as it moved around tan increasing, and the cyclone began weakening as it remained just off the coast. Between 1100 and 1200 UTC on May 20, Laila made landfall near Bapatla, Andhra Pradesh.

Preparations and impact

Sri Lanka
Cyclone Laila displaced nearly 280,000 people, triggering floods, delaying flights and submerging many areas of capital Colombo. The indirect impact of the cyclone was compounded as heavy pre-monsoonal showers set in over parts of the country as the storm developed over the Bay of Bengal. The Sri Lanka air force helicopters and navy vessels were pressed into service to ferry stranded passengers from Colombo to the international airport after parts of the connecting roads were washed away. All international and domestic flights were either delayed or cancelled because of heavy rain. Colombo experienced 350 mm of rain over the last five days ending May 20.

Thousands of passengers were also stranded after railway tracks were flooded across the country. Several train stations had to suspend operations. The Lankan Parliament, located in a Colombo suburb, was adjourned after an adjoining lake threatened to overflow and flood the premises. The weather conditions experienced were caused after Sri Lanka was hit by 'feeder bands' (clouds on the outer spirals of a cyclone but connected to its centre) of the cyclone as it moved up the Indian east coast.

India

Andhra Pradesh
Early in the duration of the cyclone, the IMD noted the potential for heavy rainfall and gusty winds along the coast of Andhra Pradesh. The agency advised fishermen to avoid being in open seas. Additionally, the agency contacted state governments in the region to warn of the storm's threat. The weather office has stated that the cyclone will not have an effect on the monsoon season.

Cyclone Laila battered Ongole town; it received heavy rain of 320 mm on May 20 and 142 mm on May 21, and has made rivulets like Gundlakamma, Addavagu and Pothurajukalva swollen. Addanki received the highest rainfall of 522 mm, followed by Maddipadu with 510 mm and Kothapatnam  in 24 hours on May 21.

The cyclone caused heavy destruction in Prakasam, Krishna and Guntur districts and preliminary reports prepared by the State government put the loss at over Rs 500 crore. According to a BBC report, Cyclone Laila was the worst storm to hit Andhra Pradesh in 14 years.

Tamil Nadu
Nine people were killed in rain related incidents in Tamil Nadu, as the cyclonic storm "Laila" battered the Coastal areas in Northern parts of Tamil Nadu, Chennai city and its suburbs.

References

External links
India Meteorological Department
Joint Typhoon Warning Center 

Laila
2010 disasters in India
Laila
Laila